Tokarnia  is a village in Myślenice County, Lesser Poland Voivodeship, in southern Poland. It is the seat of the gmina (administrative district) called Gmina Tokarnia.

External links
 Jewish Community in Tokarnia on Virtual Shtetl

References

Villages in Myślenice County